Directorate of Registration is a Bangladesh government directorate under the Ministry of Law, Justice and Parliamentary Affairs, which responsible for registration of property and collecting registration tax. It is also responsible for registration of marriage in Bangladesh.

History
Directorate of Registration was established in 1973 by the Government of Bangladesh as the Registration Department. In January 2018, the Registration Department was upgraded to Directorate of Registration following the instruction of Prime Minister Sheikh Hasina. Minister of Law, Justice and Parliamentary Affairs, Anisul Huq, on 23 March 2019 criticized corruption within the directorate.

References

1973 establishments in Bangladesh
Organisations based in Dhaka
Government agencies of Bangladesh
Government departments of Bangladesh